The Haigazian Armenological Review is an annual academic journal specializing in Armenian studies. 

It was established in 1970 by the Department of Armenian Studies at Haigazian University and publishes articles on Armenian studies in Armenian, English, French, Arabic, and occasionally other languages.

References

External links
 

Haigazian University
Armenian studies journals
Multilingual journals
Arabic-language journals
Armenian-language journals
English-language journals
French-language journals
Publications established in 1970
Annual journals
1970 establishments in Lebanon